Phyllophora sicula, the hand leaf bearer, is a small red marine alga.

Description
It has a short, erect, terete stipe which expands as a flattened blade branching once or twice. The blades have a cartilaginous texture with a medulla of large cells within a cortex of one or two layers of small cells.

Reproduction
Gametangial plants are unknown. Tetrasporangial patches occur in the center of the blade.

Habitat

Distribution
It is generally recorded from the southwest of Great Britain, Ireland, Portugal, and elsewhere in the Mediterranean. The type locality is in Italy.

References

Phyllophoraceae